American Virgin is a 1999 comedy film directed by Jean-Pierre Marois. Its plot is about a young woman, Katrina Bartalotti (Mena Suvari), the daughter of an adult film director (Robert Loggia), who agrees to lose her virginity onscreen to spite her father.

Cast 
 Mena Suvari as Katrina
 Robert Loggia as Ronny
 Bob Hoskins as Joey
 Sally Kellerman as Quaint McPerson
 Mark Adair-Rios as Male Security Guard
 Jason Bercy as Messenger
 Brian Bloom as Brad
 Octavia Spencer as Agnes Large
 Michael Cudlitz as Bob
 Freda Foh Shen as Marge
 Life Garland as Crip
 Penny Griego as Anchorwoman
 Elizabeth Guber as Operator
 Jim Czarnecki as Teacher
 Carrie Ann Inaba as Hiromi
 Ron Jeremy as Desk Sergeant
 Lamont Johnson as Nick
 Ira Israel as Ira
 Esai Morales as Jim the Director
 Gabriel Mann as Brian
 Jerry Waskiw as Jerry Vegas

Production 
The film's original working title was Live Virgin, but changed to American Virgin to capitalize on Suvari's previous successes in American Pie and American Beauty.

Critical response 

On Rotten Tomatoes the film has an approval rating of 29% based on reviews from 7 critics.

Michael Sauter of Entertainment Weekly gave it a grade F and called it "Damn near unwatchable."

References

External links 
 

1999 films
1999 comedy films
American comedy films
American satirical films
Films about virginity
Films about pornography
Lionsgate films
1990s English-language films
1990s American films